Aris Demaj, known professionally as Killua, is an Albanian singer and songwriter.

Life and career

Early life and career beginnings 

Killua was born as Aris Demaj into an ethnic Albanian family. Demaj caught national attention in the Albanian-speaking Balkans in late 2021, upon the release of "Bageti e Bujqësi" as the lead single from his upcoming debut album, Metamorfoza. The single's title is derived from the poem of the same title written by Albanian poet Naim Frashëri in the 19th century. It peaked at number 2 on the Albanian Top 100 in early November 2021 and rose to number one a week later. Prior to its solo success, Demaj was featured on Albanian disc jockey Arnon's successful "Te molla" in August 2018. The Albanian-language song became a top 15 single in Albania and reached number 13 in the Commonwealth of Independent States.

Discography

Albums 
 Metamorfoza (TBA)

Singles

As lead artist

As featured artist

References 

Living people
21st-century Albanian male singers
Albanian hip hop singers
Albanian-language singers
Albanian songwriters
Date of birth unknown
Year of birth missing (living people)